Fujian SBS Xunxing Sturgeons (Simplified Chinese: 福建SBS浔兴鲟) or Fujian Xunxing or Fujian SBS are a Chinese professional men's basketball team in the Chinese Basketball Association, based in Jinjiang, Quanzhou, Fujian. The "SBS" reflects corporate sponsorship from the Jinjiang-based Fujian SBS Zipper Science and Technology Corporation. Unlike all the other teams in the CBA, the team originally had no English–friendly animal–type nickname. They have since begun using the name Sturgeons.

The Fujian Sturgeons made their debut in the 2004–2005 season, and finished in seventh and last place in the South Division, out of the playoffs. In 2005–2006, they tied for fifth, just one win away from making the playoffs.

Current roster

Seasons

Notable players 

  Chris Porter (2005, 2006–2010)
  Liu Yudong (2007–2010)
  Zhao Tailong (2007–2010)
  Matt Freije (2008–2009)
  Jelani McCoy (2009–2010)
  Dwayne Jones (2010–2011)
  Andre Emmett (2010–2011)
  Sundiata Gaines (2012–2013)
  Will McDonald (2012–2014)
  Wang Zhelin (2012–) (Was drafted by the Memphis Grizzlies in 2016)
  Delonte West (2013–2014)
  Samad Nikkhah Bahrami (2013–2014)
  Al Harrington (2014)
  John Lucas III (2014–2015)
  D. J. White (2014–2015)
  Jarrid Famous (2015)
  Fadi El Khatib (2015–2016)
  Dwight Buycks (2015–2016)
  Jeremy Tyler (2015–2016)
  J.J. Hickson (2016–2017)
  Dwight Buycks (2016–2017)
  Sebastian Telfair (2016–2017)
  Russ Smith (2017–2018)
  Mike Harris (2017–2018)
 Xavier Munford (2018)
  Amar'e Stoudemire (2019)
  Erick Green (2019-20)
  Ty Lawson (2020)

Head coaches 

 Aaron McCarthy (2004–2010)
 Zhang Degui (2010)
 J. C. Owens (2010–2011)
 Ma Lianbao (2011)
 Casey Owens (2011–2012)
 Tab Baldwin & Nenad Vučinić (as a technical consultant) (2012–2013)
 Zhu Shilong (2013)
 Zhang Degui (2013–2014)
 Judas Prada (2014)
 Zhu Shilong (2014)
 Aleksandar Kesar (2014–2015)
 Cui Wangjun (2015–2016)
 Xu Guijun (2016–2017)
 Fan Bin (2017–2018)
 Zhu Shilong (2018–)

References

External links
 SBS Sport official website 
 Team profile at Sports.Sina.com.cn 

Chinese Basketball Association teams
Sport in Quanzhou
Jinjiang, Fujian
Basketball teams established in 1999
1999 establishments in China